Marstrup is a town in southeastern Jutland in the Haderslev Municipality, in Region of Southern Denmark. As of 1 January 2022, it has a population of 782.

Notable residents 
 Rasmus Byriel Iversen (born 1997), Danish cyclist
 Lene Christensen, Danish footballer

References

External links

Cities and towns in the Region of Southern Denmark
Haderslev Municipality